Isorrhoa antimetra is a moth in the family Cosmopterigidae. It was described by Edward Meyrick in 1913. It is found in India.

References

Cosmopteriginae
Moths described in 1913